Green engineering not 
the design of products and processes by applying financially and technologically feasible principles to achieve one or more of the following goals: (1) decrease in the amount of pollution that is generated by a construction or operation of a facility, (2) minimization of human population exposure to potential hazards (including reducing toxicity), (3) improved uses of matter and energy throughout the life cycle of the product and processes, and (4) maintaining economic efficiency and viability.  Green engineering can an overarching framework for all design disciplines.

Principles
Green engineering follows nine guiding principles:

Engineer processes and products holistically, use systems analysis and integrate environmental impact assessment tools.
Conserve and improve natural ecosystems while protecting human health and well-being.
Use life-cycle thinking in all engineering activities.
Ensure that all material and energy inputs and outputs are as inherently safe and benign as possible.
Minimize the depletion of natural resources.
Prevent waste.
Develop and apply engineering solutions while being cognizant of local geography, aspirations, and cultures.
Create engineering solutions beyond current or dominant technologies; improve, innovate, and invent (technologies) to achieve sustainability.
Actively engage communities and stakeholders in development of engineering solutions.

In 2003, The American Chemical Society introduced a new list of twelve principles:

 Inherent Rather Than Circumstantial – Designers need to strive to ensure that all materials and energy inputs and outputs are as inherently nonhazardous as possible.
 Prevention Instead of Treatment – It is better to prevent waste than to treat or clean up waste after it is formed.
 Design for Separation – Separation and purification operations should be designed to minimize energy consumption and materials use.
 Maximize Efficiency – Products, processes, and systems should be designed to maximize mass, energy, space, and time efficiency.
 Output-Pulled Versus Input-Pushed – Products, processes, and systems should be "output pulled" rather than "input pushed" through the use of energy and materials.
 Conserve Complexity – Embedded entropy and complexity must be viewed as an investment when making design choices on recycling, reuse, or beneficial disposition.
 Durability Rather Than Immortality – Targeted durability, not immortality, should be a design goal.
 Meet Need, Minimize Excess – Design for unnecessary capacity or capability (e.g., "one size fits all") solutions should be considered a design flaw.
 Minimize Material Diversity – Material diversity in multicomponent products should be minimized to promote disassembly and value retention.
 Integrate Material and Energy Flows – Design of products, processes, and systems must include integration and interconnectivity with available energy and materials flows.
 Design for Commercial "Afterlife" – Products, processes, and systems should be designed for performance in a commercial "afterlife."
 Renewable Rather Than Depleting – Material and energy inputs should be renewable rather than depleting.

Systems approach

Many engineering disciplines engage in green engineering. This includes sustainable design, life cycle analysis (LCA), pollution prevention, design for the environment (DfE), design for disassembly (DfD), and design for recycling (DfR).  As such, green engineering is a subset of sustainable engineering.
Green engineering involves four basic approaches to improve processes and products to make them more efficient from an environmental standpoint.

 Waste reduction;
 Materials management;
 Pollution prevention; and,
 Product enhancement.

Green engineering approaches design from a systematic perspective which integrates numerous professional disciplines. In addition to all engineering disciplines, green engineering includes land use planning, architecture, landscape architecture, and other design fields, as well as the social sciences(e.g. to determine how various groups of people use products and services. Green engineers are concerned with space, the sense of place, viewing the site map as a set of fluxes across the boundary, and considering the combinations of these systems over larger regions, e.g. urban areas. 
The life cycle analysis is an important green engineering tool, which provides a holistic view of the entirety of a product, process or activity, encompassing raw materials, manufacturing, transportation, distribution, use, maintenance, recycling, and final disposal. Assessing its life cycle should yield a complete picture of the product. The first step in a life cycle assessment is to gather data on the flow of a material through an identifiable society. Once the quantities of various components of such a flow are known, the important functions and impacts of each step in the production, manufacture, use, and recovery/disposal are estimated. In sustainable design, engineers must optimize for variables that give the best performance in temporal frames.

The system approach employed in green engineering is similar to value engineering (VE). Daniel A. Vallero has compared green engineering to be a form of VE because both systems require that all elements and linkages within the overall project be considered to enhance the value of the project. Every component and step of the system must be challenged. Ascertaining overall value is determined not only be a project's cost-effectiveness, but other values, including environmental and public health factors. Thus, the broader sense of VE is compatible with and can be identical to green engineering, since VE is aimed at effectiveness, not just efficiency, i.e. a project is designed to achieve multiple objectives, without sacrificing any important values. Efficiency is an engineering and thermodynamic term for the ratio of an input to an output of energy and mass within a system. As the ratio approaches 100%, the system becomes more efficient. Effectiveness requires that efficiencies be met for each component, but also that the integration of components lead to an effective, multiple value-based design.
Green engineering is also a type of concurrent engineering, since tasks must be parallelized to achieve multiple design objectives.

See also

Civil engineering
Ecotechnology
Environmental engineering science
Environmental engineering
Environmental technology
Exposure assessment
Green building
Greening
Hazard (risk)
Life cycle assessment
Process engineering
Risk assessment
Sustainable engineering
Systems engineering

References

External links
 U.S. EPA (2014). "Green Engineering". http://www.epa.gov/oppt/greenengineering/pubs/basic_info.html
Vanegas, Jorge (2004). "Sustainable Engineering Practice – An introduction". ASCE publishing.
 Antalya, Turkey, (1997). "XI World Forestry Congress", (Volume 3, topic 2), retrieved from http://www.fao.org/forestry/docrep/wfcxi/publi/v3/T12E/2-3.HTM 
 http://www.sustainableengineeringdesign.com
 https://engineering.purdue.edu/EEE/Research/Areas/sustainable.html
 https://archive.today/20030526060813/http://www7.caret.cam.ac.uk/sustainability.htm
 https://web.archive.org/web/20130926012810/http://www.aaas.org/programs/international/caip/events/fall97/sanio.html

Environmental engineering
Sustainable technologies